An Indian settlement is a census subdivision outlined by the Canadian government Department of Aboriginal Affairs and Northern Development Canada for census purposes. These areas have at least 10 status Indian or non-status Indian people who live, more or less, permanently in the given area. They are usually located on Crown land owned by the federal or provincial government and have not been set apart for the use and the benefit of an Indian band, as is the case with Indian reserves.

See also 
 Indian Land Claims Settlements
 List of Indian settlements in Alberta
 List of Indian settlements in Quebec

References 

 
Populated places in Canada
First Nations
Census divisions of Canada